Edward Livingston (1764–1836) was a U.S. Senator from Louisiana from 1829 to 1831. Senator Livingston may also refer to:

Charles L. Livingston (1800–1873), New York State Senate
David Livingston (politician) (fl. 2010s), Arizona State Senate
Edward Philip Livingston (1779–1843), New York State Senate
Henry A. Livingston (1776–1849), New York State Senate
Jacob H. Livingston (1896–1950), New York State Senate
Leonidas F. Livingston (1832–1912), Georgia State Senate
Peter R. Livingston (1766–1847), New York State Senate
Philip Livingston (1716–1778), New York State Senate
Steve Livingston (fl. 2010s), Alabama State Senate
William E. Livingston (1832–1919), Massachusetts State Senate